Monty Hakansson (28 October 1919 – 15 February 1992) was a Swedish wrestler. He moved to Australia in 1948, becoming an Australian citizen. He competed in the men's Greco-Roman flyweight at the 1956 Summer Olympics, representing Australia.

References

External links
 

1919 births
1992 deaths
Swedish male sport wrestlers
Australian male sport wrestlers
Wrestlers at the 1956 Summer Olympics
People from Kävlinge Municipality
Olympic wrestlers of Australia
Sportspeople from Skåne County